Samuel B. Hasey (July 24, 1822 – September 6, 1912) was a member of the Wisconsin State Assembly in 1874. Additionally, he was chairman of the Town Board of Elba, Wisconsin in 1853, of York, Dane County, Wisconsin in 1866 and of Hampden, Wisconsin in 1871. He was a Republican.

Hasey was born on July 24, 1822, in Londonderry, Vermont. He married Mary Emeline Anderson (1826–1922) in 1852. He died in 1912 and was buried in Columbus, Wisconsin. Together with his brothers John and Alfred, Samuel Hasey was well known as one of three nonagenarian brothers living in Columbus in 1912.

References

External links

1822 births
1912 deaths
People from Londonderry, Vermont
Republican Party members of the Wisconsin State Assembly
Mayors of places in Wisconsin
People from Dane County, Wisconsin
People from Elba, Wisconsin
People from Columbia County, Wisconsin
Burials in Wisconsin
19th-century American politicians